Spiros Mantzavinos is an American politician. He is a Democratic member of the Delaware Senate representing District 7.

References

American people of Greek descent
Democratic Party Delaware state senators
Living people
Year of birth missing (living people)
Place of birth missing (living people)